Iglesia de San Esteban is a former Catholic church in Burgos, Spain, on the eastern perimeters of Burgos Castle. It was essentially built between the late thirteenth and early fourteenth century. It now houses the Museo del Retablo.

References

Roman Catholic churches in Burgos
Buildings and structures completed in the 14th century